Marcello Salazar M. Bergo (born March 27, 1981, in Rio de Janeiro) is a Brazilian mixed martial artist. He is a member of the Brazilian Top Team, and is currently a full-time instructor at Brazilian Top Team-Jacksonville in Jacksonville, Florida.

Biography

Marcello Salazar Bergo was born in Rio de Janeiro, Brazil, on March 27, 1981, to Silvia Helena Mousinho, of Portuguese ancestry and Victor Salazar Bergo, of Italian ancestry.

At the age of 8, Marcello learned Brazilian Jiu Jitsu from Coach Juarez Soares, a methodological specialist in training children. In 2004, Marcello Salazar received his black belt at the age of 24 from Brazilian Top Team founders and head coach Murilo Bustamante and Mario Sperry who received their black belts from the legendary Carlson Gracie.

After conquering various national and international titles in Brazilian Jiu Jitsu, and over 300 submission grappling and wrestling matches to his credit, Marcello made the decision to undertake and compete in MMA. His professional MMA record currently stands at 8 wins and only 1 loss, and avenged that loss in a rematch.

For fun and entertainment he surfs with friends; enjoys playing chess with members of his family, and reading political science articles and books in his spare time.

Mixed martial arts career
In his second to last fight he avenged his only professional loss after defeating Alex Cook at the IFL World Grand Prix Finals. The fight went all 3, 4 minute rounds ending in a Unanimous Decision in favor of Salazar. Marcello dominated the entire fight with relentless takedowns and GnP, but was unable to finish.

Marcello has dedicated himself to and represented the Brazilian Top Team with major international success. Marcello has won the Brazilian and Rio de Janeiro State Championships of Jiu Jitsu, the European Submission Wrestling Championship, and—three times—the Brazilian Circuit Championship of Submission Wrestling. He represented Brazil on their Olympic Free Style and Greco Roman Wrestling Teams. Three times he was the Brazilian National Champion of Greco Roman Wrestling; four times the Free Style Wrestling Champion. And in the US, he has won the American Nationals NO-GI in 2008, and took 3rd in the [BJJ World Championships] in 2008. He was undefeated in MMA as an Amateur, and, as a Professional Fighter, he has lost only once— and avenged that loss in a rematch.

He has also competed in an 8-man tournament where he finished all three of his fights by submission in the first round to win the tournament. The event was held on September 23, 2006, in Foz do Iguacu, Brazil, under the International Challenge Championship (ICC) banner.

Sport accomplishments
(Marcello often competes at 82 & 88 kg)

BJJ and Grappling

ADCC PRO North American BJJ Championship Gi 2009 (ADCC) - First Place
World Grappling Championship Gi 2008 (FILA) - First Place
World Grappling Championship No Gi 2008 (FILA) - Second Place
World BJJ Championship No Gi 2008 (IBJJF) - Third Place
Pan American BJJ Championship No Gi 2008 (IBJJF) - Third Place
American BJJ Championship No Gi 2008 (USBJJF) - First Place
North American Grappling Championship No Gi 2008 (NAGA) - First Place
European Grappling Championship No Gi 2006 (FFG) - First Place
Brazilian Grappling Circuit No Gi 2004 / 2005 (SETE/RJ) - First Place
Abu Dhabi Trials No Gi 2004 (ADCC) - First Place
BJJ Championship Gi 1999 (CBJJ) - Third Place
RJ State BJJ Championship Gi 1999 (FJJ/RJ) - First Place
BJJ Championship Gi 1998 (CBJJ) - First Place

1. ADCC (Abu Dhabi Combat Club)
2. FILA (Fédération Internationale des Luttes Associées)
3. IBJJF (International Brazilian Jiu Jitsu Federation)
4. USBJJF (United States Brazilian Jiu Jitsu Federation)
5. NAGA (North American Grappling Associations)
6. FFG (Fédération Françoise de Grappling)
7. SETE/RJ (Secretaria Estadual de Turismo e Esporte do Rio de Janeiro)
8. CBJJ (Confederação Brasileira de Jiu Jitsu)
9. FJJ/RJ (Federação de Jiu Jitsu do Rio de Janeiro)

Wrestling

RJ State Freestyle Championship 2004 / 2005 / 2006 (LWERJ) - First Place
RJ State Greco Roman Championship 2004 / 2005 / 2006 (LWERJ) - First Place
Greco Roman Olympic Circuit 2003 (COB) - First Place
Freestyle Olympic Circuit 2003 (COB) - First Place
Brazilian Greco Roman Championship 2003 (CBLA) - First Place
Brazilian Freestyle Championship 2002 / 2003 (CBLA) - First Place
Brazilian Freestyle Jr Championship 2001 (CBLA) - First Place
RJ Greco Roman Championship 2001 (FLOAERJ) - First Place
RJ Freestyle Championship 2001 (FLOAERJ) - First Place

1. LWERJ (Liga de Wrestling do Estado do Rio de Janeiro)
2. COB (Comitê Olímpico Brasileiro)
3. CBLA (Confederação Brasileira de lutas Associadas)
4. FLOAERJ (Federação de Lutas Olímpicas e Associadas do Estado do Rio de Janeiro)

MMA (Mixed Martial Arts)

World Grand Prix Finals 2007 (IFL) - Winner
Shoot Revolution 2007 - Winner
Eight Men Grand Prix 2006 (ICC) - Winner Three Times
Staredown City 2006 - Winner
Conquista Fight 2003 - Winner

1. IFL (International Fight League)
2. ICC (International Challenge Championship)

Mixed martial arts record

|-
| Win
| align=center| 8–1–2
| Dimitri Burgo
| Submission (kimura)
| MMAAD: MMA Against Dengue 2
| 
| align=center| 1
| align=center| 3:27
| Rio de Janeiro, Brazil
| 
|-
| Win
| align=center| 7–1–2
| Alex Cook
| Decision (unanimous)
| IFL: World Grand Prix Finals 2007
| 
| align=center| 3
| align=center| 4:00
| Uncasville, Connecticut, United States
| 
|-
| Win
| align=center| 6–1–2
| Renato Gabardi
| Submission (heel hook)
| Shoot: Revolution
| 
| align=center| 1
| align=center| 2:58
| Brazil
| 
|-
| Win
| align=center| 5–1–2
| Ruan Castil
| Submission (keylock)
| ICC: International Challenge Championship
| 
| align=center| 1
| align=center| 4:19
| Foz do Iguaçu, Brazil
| 
|-
| Win
| align=center| 4–1–2
| Rubens Zanatta
| Submission (ankle lock)
| ICC: International Challenge Championship
| 
| align=center| 1
| align=center| 3:54
| Foz do Iguaçu, Brazil
| 
|-
| Win
| align=center| 3–1–2
| Rodrigo Almeida
| Submission (rear-naked choke)
| ICC: International Challenge Championship
| 
| align=center| 1
| align=center| 3:14
| Foz do Iguaçu, Brazil
| 
|-
| Draw
| align=center| 2–1–2
| Paul Jenkins
| Draw (majority)
| CWFC: Showdown
| 
| align=center| 3
| align=center| 5:00
| Sheffield, England, United Kingdom
| 
|-
| Draw
| align=center| 2–1–1
| Karl Amoussou
| Draw
| Championnat D'Europe
| 
| align=center| 2
| align=center| N/A
| Geneva, Switzerland
| 
|-
| Loss
| align=center| 2–1
| Alex Cook
| TKO (punches)
| CWFC: Strike Force 5
| 
| align=center| 2
| align=center| 3:02
| Coventry, England, United Kingdom
| 
|-
| Win
| align=center| 2–0
| Xander Nel
| Submission (kimura)
| SC: Staredown City
| 
| align=center| 1
| align=center| 0:56
| Holland, Netherlands
| 
|-
| Win
| align=center| 1–0
| Alexandre Lima
| Decision (split)
| CF 1: Conquista Fight 1
| 
| align=center| 3
| align=center| 5:00
| Bahia, Brazil
| 
|-

Personal life
Marcello has an older brother and a twin sister. In 2008, his daughter, Katarina Gruenzner Bergo, was born in Portland, Oregon (USA).In 2011 his son Olav Gruenzner Bergo was born in San Antonio, Texas (USA). In 2019, his daughter Helena Kay Bergo, was born in Jacksonville, Florida (USA).  In 2007, Marcello Salazar earned a bachelor's degree in History from UGF University, Rio de Janeiro. He is currently the head instructor at Brazilian Top Team Jacksonville and is a police officer/SWAT officer for the Jacksonville Sherriff's Office.

References

External links
 
 http://www.btt-texas.com/instructors.html

1981 births
Living people
Brazilian male mixed martial artists
Middleweight mixed martial artists
Mixed martial artists utilizing Brazilian jiu-jitsu
Brazilian practitioners of Brazilian jiu-jitsu
People awarded a black belt in Brazilian jiu-jitsu
Sportspeople from Rio de Janeiro (city)
Brazilian people of Portuguese descent
Brazilian people of Italian descent
Brazilian expatriate sportspeople in the United States